Pribrezhnaya is a rural locality (a village) in Chertkovskoye Rural Settlement, Selivanovsky District, Vladimir Oblast, Russia. The population was 1 as of 2010.

Geography 
Pribrezhnaya is located on the Kestromka River, 17 km north of Krasnaya Gorbatka (the district's administrative centre) by road. Bolshoye Grigorovo is the nearest rural locality.

References 

Rural localities in Selivanovsky District